Michael Kearns may refer to:

 Michael Kearns (actor) (born 1950), American actor, writer, director, teacher, producer, and activist
 Michael Kearns (computer scientist), American computer scientist
 Michael P. Kearns, American politician
 Mike Kearns (1929-2009), American basketball player
 Mick Kearns (footballer, born 1938), English footballer
 Mick Kearns (footballer, born 1950), Irish footballer

See also
 Mickey Kearins, Gaelic football player